Molly Rose Tuttle (born January 14, 1993) is an American vocalist, songwriter, banjo player and guitarist, recording artist and teacher in the bluegrass tradition, noted for her flatpicking, clawhammer, and crosspicking guitar prowess. She has cited Laurie Lewis, Kathy Kallick, Alison Krauss and Hazel Dickens as role models. In 2017, Tuttle was the first woman to win the International Bluegrass Music Association's Guitar Player of the Year award. In 2018 she won the award again, along with being named the Americana Music Association's Instrumentalist of the Year. Tuttle won the Best Bluegrass Album and received a nomination for the all-genre Best New Artist award at the 65th Annual Grammy Awards.

Biography

Early career
Born in Santa Clara, California and raised in Palo Alto, Tuttle began playing guitar at age 8. At age 11, she played onstage with her father Jack Tuttle, a bluegrass multi-instrumentalist and instructor. At age 15, she joined her family band The Tuttles with AJ Lee. Her siblings Sullivan (guitar) and Michael (mandolin), and mandolist AJ Lee are also in the band.

In 2006, at age 13, Tuttle recorded The Old Apple Tree with her dad, an album of duets. Tuttle graduated from Palo Alto High School in 2011.

In 2011, the Tuttles self-released their Introducing the Tuttles album, and the Endless Ocean album in 2013.

In 2012, Tuttle was awarded merit scholarships to the Berklee College of Music for music and composition, received the Foundation for Bluegrass Music's first Hazel Dickens Memorial Scholarship, won the Chris Austin Songwriting Competition at the Merlefest Music Festival, and appeared with her dad on A Prairie Home Companion.

Collaborations
While studying at the Berklee College of Music, in 2014, Tuttle met and joined the all-female bluegrass group the Goodbye Girls. They combine bluegrass, jazz, and Swedish folk music. Other members are Allison de Groot (banjo), Lena Jonsson (fiddle), and Brittany Karlson (bass). They released an EP Going to Boston in 2014, and the album Snowy Side of the Mountain in 2016. The band has also toured Jonsson's home country Sweden several times.

Tuttle also recorded Molly Tuttle & John Mailander, a duet EP with fiddler John Mailander.

In 2018, she joined Alison Brown, Missy Raines, Sierra Hull, and Becky Buller in a supergroup. The quintet performed at the Rockygrass festival in Lyons Colorado on July 27, 2018. Initially known as the Julia Belles, the group later became known as the First Ladies of Bluegrass. Additional gigs were booked at Analog at the Hutton Hotel in Nashville on Sept 18, 2018 and the IBMA Wide Open Bluegrass Festival on September 28, 2018. She also collaborated with Billy Strings on the songs "Sittin' on Top of the World" and "Billy in the Lowground."

The First Ladies of Bluegrass are featured on the first single from a full-length CD by Missy Raines titled Royal Traveler released in 2018 on Compass Records.

Solo career

In 2015, Tuttle moved from Boston to Nashville. Her EP Rise was released in 2017 after a crowdfunding campaign. She wrote all of the songs on the 7-song album, which was produced by Kai Welch. Guests included Darrell Scott, the Milk Carton Kids, Kathy Kallick, and Nathaniel Smith.

She formed The Molly Tuttle Band, which includes Wes Corbett (banjo), Joe K. Walsh (mandolin), and Hasee Ciaccio (bass).

In 2017, Tuttle signed with Alison Brown's Compass Records.

Molly was selected by Buddy Miller to join his "Cavalcade of Stars" section of Hardly Strictly Bluegrass on the Rooster Stage on October 6, 2018.

Tuttle released her debut album When You're Ready via Compass Records on April 5, 2019.

Next she released ... but I'd rather be with you again on Compass Records in August 2020.

In January 2022, Nonesuch Records announced a release by Molly Tuttle & Golden Highway titled Crooked Tree on April 1, 2022.

Personal life
Tuttle was diagnosed with alopecia areata when she was three years old, which quickly progressed to alopecia universalis, resulting in total body hair loss.

Discography

Solo albums

The Goodbye Girls
 2014: Going to Boston (self-released)
 2016: Snowy Side of the Mountain (self-released)

Molly Tuttle and John Mailander
 2014: Molly Tuttle and John Mailander EP (Back Studio)

The Tuttles With AJ Lee
 2012: Introducing the Tuttles With AJ Lee (self-released)
 2013: Endless Ocean (self-released)

Molly and Jack Tuttle
 2007: The Old Apple Tree (Back Studio)

As a featured artist
 2015: Mile Rocks - Mile Rocks and Friends (Audio & Video Labs)
 2017: AJ Lee - AJ Lee (self-released)
 2017: Korby Lenker - Thousand Springs (Relativity)
 2017: Bobby Osborne - Original (Compass)
 2017: Billy Strings - Turmoil & Tinfoil (Apostol)
 2019: Old Crow Medicine Show - “Live at the Ryman” (Columbia)
 2021: Béla Fleck - “My Bluegrass Heart” (Renew)

Awards and nominations

A. with Missy Raines, Alison Brown, Becky Buller and Sierra Hull
B. Molly Tuttle (artist), Molly Tuttle/Sarah Siskind (writer)
C. Roland White with Justin Hiltner, Jon Weisberger, Patrick McAvinue, and Molly Tuttle (artists), Ty Gilpin, Jon Weisberger (producer), Mountain Home Music Company (label)

References

External links 
 
 
 
 
 

1993 births
Living people
American bluegrass guitarists
American bluegrass musicians
Singer-songwriters from California
American women country singers
American country singer-songwriters
21st-century American singers
21st-century American women singers
Country musicians from California
Palo Alto High School alumni
People from Santa Clara, California
People from Palo Alto, California
Berklee College of Music alumni
Grammy Award winners